Kuens is a comune (municipality) in South Tyrol in northern Italy, located about  northwest of the city of Bolzano in the Passeier Valley.

Geography

Kuens borders the following municipalities: Riffian, Schenna and Tirol.

History
In the early eighth century, Kuens became the site of a small monastery founded by Saint Corbinian, who had been struck by the area's beauty on the second of his journeys to Rome. He bought some properties and planted vineyards and orchards and considered the area a "spiritual homeland", so much so that he chose it as the site for his burial.

Coat-of-arms
The emblem represents a bishop (that is, Saint Corbinian) with a gules mantle, the mitre of Or and aureola; a pastoral staff of Or in his right hand. A brown bear, with a load tied up to her back, through the bishop. The emblem was adopted in 1968.

Society

Linguistic distribution
According to the 2011 census, 96.28% of the population speak German, 3.47% Italian and 0.25% Ladin as first language.

Demographic evolution

References

External links
 Homepage of the municipality

Municipalities of South Tyrol